Norisbeth Isais Agudo González (born May 22, 1992) is a Venezuelan beach volleyball player. She competed alongside Olaya Pérez Pazo in the women's beach volleyball tournament at the 2016 Summer Olympics.

References

1992 births
Living people
Venezuelan beach volleyball players
Venezuelan women's beach volleyball players
Olympic beach volleyball players of Venezuela
Beach volleyball players at the 2016 Summer Olympics
Competitors at the 2018 Central American and Caribbean Games
Central American and Caribbean Games bronze medalists for Venezuela
South American Games silver medalists for Venezuela
South American Games medalists in volleyball
Competitors at the 2018 South American Games
Central American and Caribbean Games medalists in beach volleyball
21st-century Venezuelan women